Pumicestone may refer to:

The Electoral district of Pumicestone in Queensland, Australia
The former name of Donnybrook, Queensland, Australia